Orachrysops regalis, the royal blue, is a butterfly of the family Lycaenidae. It is found in South Africa, where it is known from Mpumalanga to the Strydpoortberge and Letsitele Kop.

The wingspan is 34–40 mm for males and 30–42 mm for females. Adults are on wing from October to December, although the except time depends on the spring rains. There is one generation per year.

The larvae feed on Indigofera species.

References

Butterflies described in 1994
Orachrysops